Edward Woods (1903–1989) was an American actor

Edward Woods may also refer to:

Eddie Woods (born 1940), writer, editor and publisher
Eddie Woods (footballer) (born 1951), Welsh footballer
Edward Woods (bishop) (1877–1953), Bishop of Croydon, 1930–1937, and Bishop of Lichfield, 1937–1953, in the Church of England
Edward Woods (engineer) (1814–1903), British civil engineer
Richard Woods (diplomat) (born Edward Woods in 1941), government official in New Zealand
Edward John Woods (1839–1916), known as E. J. Woods, South Australian architect

See also
Edward Wood (disambiguation)